Beech Springs is an unincorporated community in Sevier County, Tennessee, United States.  Accessible by Tennessee Secondary Primary Route 139, it lies just south of Kodak.

History
The community was named for a grove of beech standing at a nearby stream.

Geography
The community is located at a mean elevation of 988 feet (301 metres) above sea level.

References 

Unincorporated communities in Sevier County, Tennessee
Unincorporated communities in Tennessee